Bagotiškiai (formerly) is a village in Kėdainiai district municipality, in Kaunas County, in central Lithuania. According to the 2011 census, the village was uninhabited.

At the beginning of the 20th century there was Bagotiškiai folwark.

Demography

References

Villages in Kaunas County
Kėdainiai District Municipality